Corinne Simasotchi (born 11 June 1971) is a Swiss sprinter. She competed in the women's 400 metres at the 1996 Summer Olympics.

References

1971 births
Living people
Athletes (track and field) at the 1996 Summer Olympics
Swiss female sprinters
Olympic athletes of Switzerland
Place of birth missing (living people)
Olympic female sprinters